Donald Martin Carroll (November 25, 1909 – January 3, 2002) was an American Roman Catholic priest.

Born in Chicago, Illinois, Carroll was ordained a Roman Catholic priest for the Roman Catholic Archdiocese of Chicago, Illinois on April 7, 1934. On June 27, 1956, he was appointed Bishop of the Roman Catholic Diocese of Rockford, Illinois, but resigned on September 25, 1956 before his consecration due to ill health.

Notes

1909 births
2002 deaths
People from Chicago
Roman Catholic Archdiocese of Chicago
Roman Catholic Diocese of Rockford
Religious leaders from Illinois
Catholics from Illinois
20th-century American Roman Catholic priests